Tiago de Melo Marinho, commonly known as Tiago, (born 9 March 1981), is a Brazilian futsal player who plays for Atlântico and the Brazilian national futsal team.

References

External links 
 FIFA profile
 Krona Futsal profile

1981 births
Living people
Futsal goalkeepers
Brazilian men's futsal players
Pan American Games gold medalists for Brazil
Futsal players at the 2007 Pan American Games
Medalists at the 2007 Pan American Games
Pan American Games medalists in futsal